The Chinese Odd Fellows Building is a two-story, thirty-by-sixty foot, privately owned brick commercial building in the historical Chinatown of Boise, Idaho. It is located on West Front Street between South Capital Boulevard and South 6th Street near the Basque Block. The building features a corbel table of projecting bricks with stepped segments.

Built in 1911, it was a Odd Fellows fraternal building, and is one of the few surviving buildings associated with the Chinese immigrant community in downtown Boise. The building was listed on the National Register of Historic Places in 1982.  It served historically as a clubhouse and as a business with shops on the first floor, and a lodge hall and sleeping rooms on the second floor. 

The building was one of many designed or built by the Tourtellotte and Hummel architectural firm of Boise that were covered in a 1982 study. Contractors Clifton and Corbridge erected the structure in the winter of 1911-1912 for the contract price of $4,648.

References

External links

Chinese-American history
Chinese-American culture in Idaho
Clubhouses on the National Register of Historic Places in Idaho
Commercial buildings completed in 1911
Boise
Buildings and structures in Boise, Idaho
National Register of Historic Places in Boise, Idaho
Tourtellotte & Hummel buildings